"Desire" is a song written by Barry Gibb, Robin Gibb and Maurice Gibb, and originally recorded by the Bee Gees in 1978 during the sessions of Spirits Having Flown. Blue Weaver recalls that this version was originally intended for the album. After spending weeks on it, they dropped it from the album lineup. Weaver also recalls that the version sounded like "Too Much Heaven".

Andy Gibb version

The single was recorded with a new lead vocal by Andy Gibb during a studio session in 1979, and released as the lead single on what would be his final studio album. The instrumental tracks used are from the original recording sessions laid down by the Bee Gees in 1978. The copyright for this song gives the artist as the 'Bee Gees' and was registered on July 11, 1979. Desire was Andy's first new single since September 1978.

Andy's version of "Desire" was released as a single in January 1980 and included on his last studio album After Dark reaching number four on the Billboard Hot 100.  Any sense that Andy was channeling the Bee Gees rather than finding his own way would be confirmed here, as all three of his brothers were heard in the background.  This is one of two songs to feature all four Gibb brothers (the other being Andy's final song, "Arrow Through The Heart", issued posthumously in 2010, 23 years after it was originally recorded.) His version would be his last top ten single in the United States. In other countries this single and its B-side "Waiting For You" which was from his Shadow Dancing album were released as a double A.

Record World said of it that "Andy's soft and lush vocal, with some intelligent percussion, incites."

The song was included as the last track on Andy Gibb's Greatest Hits, his first compilation album, as well as Greatest Hits Collection and 20th Century Masters - The Millennium Collection.

Personnel
Andy Gibb — lead and background vocals
Barry Gibb — harmony and background vocals, orchestral arrangement
Hugh McCracken — electric guitar
Joey Murcia — electric guitar
George Terry — electric guitar
George Bitzer — keyboards
Harold Cowart — bass
Ron Ziegler — drums
Robin Gibb — background vocals (from 1978)
Maurice Gibb — background vocals (from 1978)
Albhy Galuten — orchestral arrangement

Charts

Peak positions

Year-end charts

References

1978 songs
1980 singles
Songs written by Barry Gibb
Songs written by Maurice Gibb
Songs written by Robin Gibb
Bee Gees songs
Andy Gibb songs
Song recordings produced by Barry Gibb
Song recordings produced by Robin Gibb
Song recordings produced by Maurice Gibb
RSO Records singles
Song recordings produced by Albhy Galuten
Funk ballads
Soul ballads